The 2018 CONCACAF Women's U-20 Championship was the 9th edition of the CONCACAF Women's U-20 Championship, the biennial international youth football championship organised by CONCACAF for the women's under-20 national teams of the North, Central American and Caribbean region. The tournament was hosted by Trinidad and Tobago and took place between 18–28 January 2018, as announced by CONCACAF on 31 October 2017. A total of eight teams played in the tournament.

The top three teams of the tournament qualified for the 2018 FIFA U-20 Women's World Cup in France as the CONCACAF representatives. The tournament also determined which three Caribbean nations participate in the 2018 Central American and Caribbean Games.

Mexico defeated defending champions United States in the final to win their first title.

Qualification

Regional qualification tournaments were held to determine the teams playing in the final tournament.

Qualified teams
The following eight teams qualified for the final tournament.

Venues
All matches of the tournament were played at Ato Boldon Stadium in Couva.

Draw
The draw of the tournament was held on 7 November 2017, 10:00 AST (UTC−4), at the Hyatt Regency Trinidad & Tobago in Port of Spain.

The eight teams were drawn into two groups of four teams. Tournament hosts Trinidad and Tobago were seeded in position A1, while defending champions United States were seeded in position B1. The remaining six teams, including the two teams from the Caribbean Zone whose identity were not known at the time of the draw, were allocated to pots 2–4, and drawn to the remaining six positions.

Squads

Players born on or after 1 January 1998 are eligible to compete in the tournament. Each team must register a squad of 20 players, two of whom must be goalkeepers.

Group stage
The top two teams of each group advance to the semi-finals.

Tiebreakers
Teams are ranked according to points (3 points for a win, 1 point for a draw, 0 points for a loss), and if tied on points, the following tiebreaking criteria are applied, in the order given, to determine the rankings:
Points in head-to-head matches among tied teams;
Goal difference in head-to-head matches among tied teams;
Goals scored in head-to-head matches among tied teams;
Goal difference in all group matches;
Goals scored in all group matches;
Drawing of lots.

All times are local, AST (UTC−4).

Group A

Group B

Knockout stage
In the semi-finals, if the match is level at the end of 90 minutes, no extra time is played and the match is decided by a penalty shoot-out. In the third place match and final, if the match is level at the end of 90 minutes, extra time is played, and if still tied after extra time, the match is decided by a penalty shoot-out.

Bracket

Semi-finals
Winners qualify for 2018 FIFA U-20 Women's World Cup.

Third place match
Winner qualifies for 2018 FIFA U-20 Women's World Cup.

Final

Winners

Qualification for international tournaments

Qualified teams for FIFA U-20 Women's World Cup
The following three teams from CONCACAF qualified for the 2018 FIFA U-20 Women's World Cup.

1 Bold indicates champions for that year. Italic indicates hosts for that year.

Qualified teams for Central American and Caribbean Games
The competition was used to decide the three teams from the Caribbean Football Union which would qualify for the 2018 Central American and Caribbean Games. As only three Caribbean teams participated in the final tournament, they all qualified:

Goalscorers
5 goals

 Jordyn Huitema

4 goals

 Nérilia Mondésir

3 goals

 Gabrielle Carle
 Shana Flynn

2 goals

 Hillary Corrales
 Dennecia Prince
 Dayana Cázares
 Belén Cruz
 Katty Martínez
 Jaelin Howell

1 goal

 Tanya Boychuk
 Daniela Coto
 Catalina Estrada
 Fabiola Villalobos
 Melchie Dumonay
 Roseline Éloissaint
 Sherly Jeudy
 Nelourde Nicolas
 Olufolasade Adamolekun
 Jazmin Grant
 Jadyn Matthews
 Jimena López
 Jacqueline Ovalle
 Yessenia Flores
 Jaclyn Gilday
 Kédie Johnson
 Aaliyah Prince
 Tierna Davidson
 Abigail Kim
 Civana Kuhlmann
 Ashley Sanchez
 Sophia Smith
 Taryn Torres

1 own goal

 Chyanne Dennis (playing against Mexico)

Awards
The following awards were given at the conclusion of the tournament.

Best XI
Goalkeeper:  Emily Alvarado
Right Back:  Kiara Pickett
Center Back:  Miriam García
Center Back:  Maya Antoine
Left Back:  Jimena López
Right Midfielder:  Jordyn Huitema
Center Midfielder:  Jaelin Howell
Center Midfielder:  Melchie Dumonay
Center Midfielder:  Savannah DeMelo
Left Midfielder:  Jacqueline Ovalle
Forward:  Nérilia Mondésir

References

External links
Under 20s – Women, CONCACAF.com

 
2018
Women's U-20 Championship
2018 in women's association football
2018 in youth association football
2017–18 in Trinidad and Tobago football
International association football competitions hosted by Trinidad and Tobago
January 2018 sports events in North America